Carolina García (born 21 March 1985) is a Chilean field hockey player.

Career

Junior National Team
García first represented the Chile Under 21 team in 2005, at the Pan-American Junior Championships in San Juan, Puerto Rico. At the tournament, García finished as highest goalscorer with 11 goals, helping Chile to third place.

Again in 2005, García represented the Chile junior team at the Junior World Cup in Santiago, Chile, where the team finished in 10th place.

Senior National Team
García debuted for the senior national team in 2003. Her first major tournament with the team was the 2003 Pan American Games.

Since her debut, García has been a regular inclusion in the national team, earning medals at one South American Games, one Pan American Cup and one Pan American Games.

García's most recent appearance for Chile was at the 2018-19 Hockey Series Open held in Santiago, Chile.

References

1985 births
Living people
Chilean female field hockey players
South American Games silver medalists for Chile
South American Games medalists in field hockey
Pan American Games medalists in field hockey
Pan American Games bronze medalists for Chile
Field hockey players at the 2011 Pan American Games
Competitors at the 2006 South American Games
Field hockey players at the 2019 Pan American Games
Medalists at the 2011 Pan American Games
20th-century Chilean women
21st-century Chilean women